Vijay Prashad is an Indian Marxist historian and commentator. He is an executive-director of Tricontinental: Institute for Social Research, the Chief Editor of LeftWord Books, and a senior non-resident fellow at Chongyang Institute for Financial Studies, Renmin University of China.

He was the George and Martha Kellner Chair in South Asian History and a professor of international studies at Trinity College in Hartford, Connecticut, United States, from 1996 to 2017. He is an advisory board member of the US Campaign for the Academic and Cultural Boycott of Israel, part of the global Boycott, Divestment and Sanctions (BDS) movement.

Early life and background
He is the son of Pran and Soni Prashad. Vijay was born and raised in Kolkata, India. Prashad attended The Doon School, an Indian residential boarding school for boys ages 12–18. He then went to the United States and received a BA from Pomona College in 1989, and earned a PhD at the University of Chicago in 1994, writing a dissertation under the supervision of Bernard S. Cohn. He is the nephew of Marxist Indian politician Brinda Karat.

Work
In an article for The Nation, Prashad lays out his vision for a struggle towards socialism. He argues that progressive forces typically have very good ideas, but no power. He states that without power, good ideas have little consequences and that socialists must organise as well as theorise. He has stated that American leftists are not as effective as they could be in situations where they win influence through community organising, such as in local governments, because they often do not appreciate ideas originating from other parts of the world. He also calls on leftists to have a long-term view of social struggle rather than focusing on short-term results. Prashad says that this short-term focus often results from an economic system where companies are incentivised to demonstrate quarterly profits.

Prashad describes himself as a Marxist. He is a co-founder of the Forum of Indian Leftists (FOIL). His views on capitalism are summarised in his book Fat Cats and Running Dogs. The historian Paul Buhle writes, "Vijay Prashad is a literary phenomenon." The writer Amitava Kumar notes, "Prashad is our own Frantz Fanon. His writing of protest is always tinged with the beauty of hope."

In 2010, Prashad was appointed to head the newly formed Trinity Institute for Interdisciplinary Studies, at Trinity College. A group of professors wrote a letter protesting the appointment based on "the prominent role he has played in promoting a boycott of Israeli universities and of study abroad in Israel". After initially refusing to meet with them, Trinity President James Jones eventually met with representatives from Jewish organisations, including the Connecticut Jewish federation, the Anti-Defamation League, and the Jewish Federation of Greater Hartford on 14 September 2010. One participant reported a "veiled threat" to have Jewish donors "weigh in". The university backed Prashad and rejected attempts to rescind his appointment.

Criticism of US foreign policy
Prashad is an outspoken critic of what he calls American hegemony and imperialism. 

Prashad debated historian Juan Cole on the 2011 US-French-NATO military intervention in Libya. Cole was for it, Prashad against. Prashad argued that the genuine Libyan rising had been "usurped" by various unsavory characters, including some with CIA connections. Prashad wrote the 2012 book Arab Spring, Libyan Winter AK Press on the topic.

Critique of Mother Teresa and Western charity

Prashad offered his analysis of Mother Teresa's missionary work in Calcutta, designating her as a representative of the collective 'bourgeois guilt' of Western nations. He argued that people like Mother Teresa obscure the tragedies of capitalism. For instance, "During the night of December 2–3, 1984, the Bhopal disaster poisoned thousands of people". He states that the Bhopal disaster, which was caused by Union Carbide, was the most flagrant example of a transnational corporation's disregard for human life in defence of its own profit. In 1983, Union Carbide's sales came to US$9 billion and its assets totalled US$10bn. Part of this profit came from a tendency to shirk any responsibility towards safety standards, not just in India, but also in their West Virginia plant. After the disaster, Mother Teresa flew into Bhopal and, escorted in two government cars, she offered Bhopal's victims small aluminium medals of St. Mary. "This could have been an accident," she told the survivors, "it's like a fire (that) could break out anywhere. That is why it is important to forgive. Forgiveness offers us a clean heart and people will be a hundred times better after it." Pope John Paul II joined Mother Teresa with his analysis that Bhopal was a "sad event" which resulted from "man's efforts to make progress."

In the same article he also commented on Mother Teresa's alleged links with Charles Keating and Michele Duvalier (wife of Haitian dictator Baby Doc Duvalier). Denouncing the "cruel rule of capital" he also offered the view that the communists of Calcutta were the "real nameless Mother Teresas who conduct the necessary work towards socialism, for the elimination of poverty forever".

Bolivia
Prashad has written extensively about the removal of Evo Morales as President of Bolivia in 2019 and the 2020 Bolivian general election. He described Morales' removal as a coup d’état and said the Organisation of American States had "legitimised" the coup with unsubstantiated conclusions in its preliminary report. In March 2020, he wrote that Morales' removal from office was the result of his government's "socialist policy toward Bolivia's resources" which required that returns from mining resources such as lithium "be properly shared with the Bolivian people". He said that the  government of Jeanine Áñez had extended a "welcome mat" to Tesla to establish a factory in Bolivia to manufacture lithium batteries from Bolivia’s reserves.

Works
 (2000) The Karma of Brown Folk. University of Minnesota Press. .
 (2002) Untouchable Freedom: A Social History of a Dalit Community. Oxford University Press. .
 (2002) War Against the Planet: The Fifth Afghan War, Imperialism and Other Assorted Fundamentalism Manohar. .
 (2002) Fat Cats and Running Dogs: The Enron Stage of Capitalism. Zed Books. .
 (2002) Everybody Was Kung Fu Fighting: Afro-Asian Connections and the Myth of Cultural Purity. Beacon Press. .
 (2003) Namaste Sharon: Hindutva and Sharonism under US Hegemony. New Delhi: LeftWord Books. .
 (2003) Keeping up with the Dow Joneses: Stocks, Jails, Welfare. Boston: South End Press. .
 (2007) The Darker Nations: A People's History of the Third World. The New Press. .
 (2012) Arab Spring, Libyan Winter. AK Press. .
 (2012) Uncle Swami: South Asians in America Today. The New Press. .
 (2013) Poorer Nations: A Possible History of the Global South. Verso. Foreword by Boutros Boutros-Ghali.
 (2015) No Free Left: The Futures of Indian Communism. New Delhi: LeftWord Books.
 (2015) Letters to Palestine. Verso Books.
 (2016) Communist Histories, vol. 1. New Delhi: LeftWord Books.
 (2016) The Death of the Nation and the Future of the Arab Revolution. University of California Press. .
 (2017) Land of Blue Helmets: the United Nations in the Arab World, co-edited with Karim Makdisi. University of California Press.
 (2017) Red October: The Russian Revolution and the Communist Horizon. New Delhi: LeftWord Books.
 (2017) Will the Flower Slip Through the Asphalt: Writers Respond to Climate Change. New Delhi: LeftWord Books.
 (2019) Red Star Over the Third World. Pluto Press. .
 (2020) Washington Bullets. New Delhi: LeftWord Books. . Preface by Evo Morales Ayma.
 (2022) Struggle Makes Us Human: Learning from Movements for Socialism. Haymarket Books. .
 (2022) The Withdrawal: Iraq, Libya, Afghanistan, and the Fragility of U.S. Power, with Noam Chomsky. The New Press. .

References

External links

Vijay Prashad's newsletters at Tricontinental: Institute for Social Research
Vijay Prashad's Faculty Profile at Trinity College
Vijay Prashad's Curriculum Vitae 
Vijay Prashad's personal blog website 
Reality Asserts Itself – Vijay Prashad . A set of 4 interviews on The Real News. (October 2014) 
Making Poverty History. Jacobin. (November 2014)
What Was Missing from Obama's Anti-Terrorism Speech . "Vijay Prashad says President Obama failed to acknowledge how Western intervention has contributed to the rise of extremism." (February 2015)
Washington’s Bullets Can’t Stamp Out the Hope of a Better World. Interview with Jacobin. (November 2020)

Indian Marxist historians
Indian Marxist journalists
Indian emigrants to the United States
American non-fiction writers
20th-century Indian journalists
Trinity College (Connecticut) faculty
University of Chicago alumni
The Doon School alumni
Living people
American Marxist historians
American male writers of Indian descent
Scholars from Kolkata
20th-century Indian historians
American male non-fiction writers
1967 births
Pomona College alumni
Historians from California
American academics of Indian descent
Indian scholars